The Caballerial was originally a skateboarding trick performed in a half pipe, but has now been adopted in styles other than vert, and is also performed in BMX. The original trick is a fakie backside 360 ollie, or in BMX, a fakie 360. The Caballerial can also be done frontside (Frontside Cab etc.) The Caballerial was named after professional skateboarder Steve Caballero, who invented the trick in 1981, originally doing the trick backside.

The Half-cab is a variation of the Caballerial where the rider only rotates 180 degrees rather than the full 360. This trick can be learned before the regular 180, if the rider has trouble landing switch.

References

Skateboarding tricks
Snowboarding tricks